Per Gustav Erik Pettersson (born 22 July 1995) is a Swedish bandy forward, currently playing for Bollnäs GIF.

Career

Club career
Pettersson is a youth product of Söderfors GoIF, which he left for Sandvikens AIK and made his debut during the 2010–11 Elitserien season.

In 2017, Pettersson joined Yenisey Krasnoyarsk.

International career
Pettersson was part of the 2017 Bandy World Championship winning team.

Honours

Country
 Sweden
 Bandy World Championship: 2017

References

External links
 
 

1995 births
Living people
Swedish bandy players
Sandvikens AIK players
Yenisey Krasnoyarsk players
Expatriate bandy players in Russia
Söderfors GoIF players
Sweden international bandy players
Bandy World Championship-winning players